UAAP Season 43 men's basketball tournament is the 1980 season of the University Athletic Association of the Philippines, which was hosted by the University of the Philippines. The opening of the 1980-1981 edition of the UAAP takes place on July 20, 1980 at the Loyola Center.

Participated by its seven schools, University of the Philippines, University of Santo Tomas, University of the East, Far Eastern University, Adamson University, National University and Ateneo de Manila University.

Men's basketball

The Far Eastern University (FEU) Tamaraws, bagged the title by scoring a rare and first sweep of the UAAP basketball series. The last team that FEU beat was the UST Glowing Goldies who ranked second in the team standings. Had UST won the last match, there would have been a twice to beat finals between the two teams in FEU's advantage. Since going into the final game, the power-leaping and hustling center of the Tamaraws, ex-US marine Anthony Williams, was good for 27 points per game.

References

43
1980 in Philippine basketball